Takeshi Usami (December 19, 1903 – January 19, 1991) was Grand Steward of the Imperial Household Agency (December 16, 1953 – May 26, 1978). He graduated from the University of Tokyo. He was a recipient of the Order of the Rising Sun.

References

Bibliography
Ikuhiko Hata　『旧制高校物語』文春新書
Ikuhiko Hata　『戦前期日本官僚制の制度・組織・人事』　University of Tokyo出版

External links
 宇佐美毅 とは - コトバンク

1903 births
1991 deaths
Grand Cordons of the Order of the Rising Sun
University of Tokyo alumni
People from Yamagata Prefecture